Luciano Rui (born 12 December 1958) is an Italian former professional racing cyclist. He rode in the 1982 Tour de France.

References

External links
 

1958 births
Living people
Italian male cyclists
Cyclists from the Province of Treviso